Smile Please  is a 2017 Indian Kannada romance film written and directed by Raghu Samarth, produced by K Manju under the banner K Manju Cinemaas. The film stars Gurunandan, Kavya Shetty, Rangayana Raghu, Sudha Belawadi, Srinivas Prabhu, Girish Shivannain the lead roles.  It began production in the mid of 2016.

Plot
The movie Smile Please revolves around the protagonist Manu Gurunandan, who is a very happy soul, so full of life and keeps celebrating the life. He is always seen smiling and making others smile. Manu's family badly want him to get married but girls keep rejecting him for his funny and bold outlook towards marriage. After hundred girls rejecting him father gives up on his marriage but the mother who is little over dramatic decides to send her son to her brother Murthy's house. What happens next is in the movie is the plot.

Cast

Gurunandan as Manamohan
Kavya Shetty as Maanasa	
 Neha Patil as Anagha													
Sudha Belawadi as Ranga Nayaki
Ravi Bhat as Paramahamsa
Srinivas Prabhu as Sachchidananda Murthy
Aruna Balraj as Gauri
Rangayana Raghu as Sadananda
Girish Shivanna as Pannaga Bhushan
Shilpa Ravi as Nivedita
Likhitesh Ravindra as Sunil
Roopesh Shetty as Roopesh
Hamsa Pratap as Ramya
Master Chinmay as Rahul
Avinash as Dr. Mithun

Soundtrack

References

External links 
 
 

2017 films
2010s Kannada-language films
Films scored by Anoop Seelin
Indian romance films
Indian coming-of-age films
2017 romance films
2010s coming-of-age films